The naval Battle of Bantam took place on 27 December 1601 in Bantam Bay (now Banten Bay), Indonesia, when an exploration fleet of 5 Dutch under the leadership of Walter Harmensz. and a fleet under André Furtado de Mendonça, sent from Goa to the Portuguese authority to restore, met in the Indonesian archipelago. The Portuguese were forced to retreat. Netherlands made three ships booty on a large Portuguese force majeure of eight galleons and miscellaneous smaller vessels.

Ships involved
 Netherlands
 Gelderland
 Zeelandia (Jan Cornelisz)
 Utrecht
 Wachter (yacht)
 Duyfken (yacht)
 Portugal (André Furtado de Mendonça), 30 vessels total
 8 galleons
 Several fustas—3 set alight and captured by Dutch

References 

Bantam
1601 in Asia
Conflicts in 1601
Battles involving the Dutch Republic
Bantam
Battles and conflicts without fatalities
Dutch conquest of Indonesia
1601 in the Dutch Empire
1601 in the Portuguese Empire